Slovenia competed at the 2002 Winter Olympics in Salt Lake City, United States.

Medalists

Alpine skiing

Men

Men's combined

Women

Biathlon

Men

Men's 4 × 7.5 km relay

Women

Women's 4 × 7.5 km relay

 1 A penalty loop of 150 metres had to be skied per missed target. 
 2 Starting delay based on 10 km sprint results. 
 3 One minute added per missed target. 
 4 Starting delay based on 7.5 km sprint results.

Cross-country skiing

Men
Sprint

Pursuit

 1 Starting delay based on 10 km C. results. 
 C = Classical style, F = Freestyle

Women
Sprint

Pursuit

 2 Starting delay based on 5 km C. results. 
 C = Classical style, F = Freestyle

4 × 5 km relay

Figure skating

Women

Freestyle skiing

Men

Nordic combined 

Men's sprint

Events:
 large hill ski jumping
 7.5 km cross-country skiing 

Men's individual

Events:
 normal hill ski jumping
 15 km cross-country skiing

Ski jumping 

Men's team large hill

 1 Four teams members performed two jumps each.

Snowboarding

Men's parallel giant slalom

References
Official Olympic Reports
International Olympic Committee results database
 Olympic Winter Games 2002, full results by sports-reference.com

Nations at the 2002 Winter Olympics
2002
Winter Olympics